Baby Blue is the fourth studio album by Mexican actress and singer Anahí, released on August 26, 2000, by Fonovisa Records.

Track listing
 "Es el Amor"  – 4:28
 "Como Cada Día"  – 4:03
 "Tranquilo Nene"  – 3:59
 "Superenamorándome"  – 3:53
 "Primer Amor"  – 5:06
 "Aquí Sigues Estando Tú"  – 4:13
 "Tu Amor Cayó del Cielo"  – 4:06
 "Volverás a Mí"  – 4:28
 "Desesperadamente Sola"  – 4:50
 "Sobredosis de Amor"  – 3:43
 "Primer Amor" (Remix)   – 3:40

References

External links
Anahí's official website

2000 albums
Anahí albums
Spanish-language albums
Albums produced by Estéfano